Empicoris errabundus is a species of thread-legged bug in the family Reduviidae. It is found in the Caribbean, Central America, and North America.

References

Further reading

 
 
 
 
 
 
 

Reduviidae
Hemiptera of Central America
Hemiptera of North America
Insects described in 1832
Taxa named by Thomas Say